Shirana Shahbazi (born 1974) is an Iranian-born photographer who now lives in Switzerland. Her work includes installations and large prints of conceptual photography.

Biography
Born in Tehran, Shahbazi moved to Germany in 1985, studying photography and design at the University of Applied Sciences and Arts in Dortmund from 1995 to 1997. From 1997 to 2000, Shahbazi attended the Zurich University of the Arts, in Switzerland, specializing in photography. She currently lives and works in Zurich. Her first successful sequence Goftare Nik/Good Words of color photographs taken in Iran (published as a book in 2001 with Hatje Cantz) led to the Citibank Private Bank Photography Prize in 2002. In 2002, she presented a series of images of Switzerland titled The Garden. At the Venice Biennale in 2003, she presented The Annunciation, an enormous installation in the central pavilion with murals by Iranian painters based on her photographs and a ceiling of lilies. She is the recipient of 2019 Prix Meret Oppenheim.

Work
Presented as an installation, her Meanwhile series (2007), combines everyday images of landscapes, portraits and still lifes from her world travels, one of her images expanded to poster size by an Iranian billboard artist. Other photographs are reproduced as paintings or even carpets. The exhibition Then Again (2012)  at the Fotomuseum Winterthur presents 18 large-format works demonstrating how a photograph can be transformed from a depiction of reality into a geometric abstraction. As discussed by Adam Jasper's review in Artforum, Shahbazi's photographs are true abstractions in that they are less a representational photograph than they are actual objects themselves, highly constructed. Continuing to work in analog photographic methods, some of Shabazi's newest works exist as geometric shapes captured on polished mirrors with thin films of color.

Exhibitions
Shahbazi's work has been widely exhibited all over the world. In 2007, Shabhazi exhibited Meanwhile at the Swiss Institute in New York City and at the Barbican Art Gallery London, in 2008. Shahbazi is represented by Galerie Peter Kilchmann, Zurich. The exhibition Monstera at Kunsthalle Bern in 2014 was curated by Fabrice Stroun and Tenzing Barshee. The artist has been exhibiting regularly since 1997, with her most recent solo exhibition at Kunsthaus Hamburg, in Germany in 2018. Numerous photographs are held in the collection of The Museum of Modern Art, New York.

Bibliography

Shahbazi, Shirana (2007). Meanwhile. JRP Ringier. 

Shahbazi, Shirana (2017). Shirana Shahbazi : first things first. Sternberg Press.

See also

Swiss contemporary artists
List of Iranian artists

References

External links
Shirana Shahbazi at Galerie Peter Kilchmann
Shirana Shahbazi at The Breeder, Athens
Michele Robecchi interview with Shirana Shahbazi, Flash Art, November 2003

1974 births
Living people
21st-century women photographers
21st-century Iranian women artists
21st-century Swiss women artists
Iranian photographers
Iranian women photographers
People from Tehran
Artists from Zürich
Iranian emigrants to Switzerland
Swiss contemporary artists
Iranian contemporary artists
Women conceptual artists